Bodo is a hamlet in central Alberta, Canada within the Municipal District of Provost No. 52. The community was named after Bodø, Norway.

Bodo is known for its archaeological site, which is one of the largest and most well-preserved pre-contact archeological areas in Western Canada. The area is run by the Bodo Archeological Society, a non-profit organization committed to the protection and preservation of the site.

Demographics 

See also 
 List of communities in Alberta
 List of hamlets in Alberta

References 

Designated places in Alberta
Hamlets in Alberta
Municipal District of Provost No. 52